Harold Joseph Laski (30 June 1893 – 24 March 1950) was an English political theorist and economist. He was active in politics and served as the chairman of the British Labour Party from 1945 to 1946 and was a professor at the London School of Economics from 1926 to 1950. He first promoted pluralism by emphasising the importance of local voluntary communities such as trade unions. After 1930, he began to emphasize the need for a workers' revolution, which he hinted might be violent. Laski's position angered Labour leaders who promised a nonviolent democratic transformation. Laski's position on democracy-threatening violence came under further attack from Prime Minister Winston Churchill in the 1945 general election, and the Labour Party had to disavow Laski, its own chairman.

Laski was one of Britain's most influential intellectual spokesmen for Marxism in the interwar years. In particular, his teaching greatly inspired students, some of whom later became leaders of the newly independent nations in Asia and Africa. He was perhaps the most prominent intellectual in the Labour Party, especially for those on the hard left who shared his trust and hope in Joseph Stalin's Soviet Union. However, he was distrusted by the moderate Labour politicians, who were in charge such as Prime Minister Clement Attlee, and he was never given a major government position or a peerage.

Born to a Jewish family, Laski was also a supporter of Zionism and supported the creation of a Jewish state.

Early life
He was born in Manchester on 30 June 1893 to Nathan and Sarah Laski. Nathan Laski was a Lithuanian Jewish cotton merchant from Brest-Litowsk in what is now Belarus and a leader of the Liberal Party, while his mother was born in Manchester to Polish Jewish parents. He had a disabled sister, Mabel, who was one year younger. His elder brother was Neville Laski, and his cousin Neville Blond was the founder of the Royal Court Theatre and the father of the author and publisher Anthony Blond.

Harold attended the Manchester Grammar School. In 1911, he studied eugenics under Karl Pearson for six months at University College London (UCL). The same year, he met and married Frida Kerry, a lecturer of eugenics. His marriage to Frida, a Gentile and eight years his senior, antagonised his family. He also repudiated his faith in Judaism by claiming that reason prevented him from believing in God. After studying for a degree in history at New College, Oxford, he graduated in 1914. He was awarded the Beit memorial prize during his time at New College. In April 1913, in the cause of women's suffrage, he and a friend planted an explosive device in the men's lavatory at Oxted railway station, Surrey: it exploded, but caused only slight damage.

Laski failed his medical eligibility tests and so missed fighting in World War I. After graduation, he worked briefly at the Daily Herald under George Lansbury. His daughter Diana was born in 1916.

Career

Academic career
In 1916, Laski was appointed as a lecturer of modern history at McGill University in Montreal and began to lecture at Harvard University. He also lectured at Yale in 1919 to 1920. For his outspoken support of the Boston Police Strike of 1919, Laski received severe criticism. He was briefly involved with the founding of The New School for Social Research in 1919, where he also lectured.

Laski cultivated a large network of American friends centred at Harvard, whose law review he had edited. He was often invited to lecture in America and wrote for The New Republic. He became friends with Felix Frankfurter, Herbert Croly, Walter Lippmann, Edmund Wilson, and Charles A. Beard. His long friendship with Supreme Court Justice Oliver Wendell Holmes, Jr. was cemented by weekly letters, which were later published. He knew many powerful figures and claimed to know many more. Critics have often commented on Laski's repeated exaggerations and self-promotion, which Holmes tolerated. His wife commented that he was "half-man, half-child, all his life".
 
Laski returned to England in 1920 and began teaching government at the London School of Economics (LSE). In 1926, he was made professor of political science at the LSE. Laski was an executive member of the socialist Fabian Society from 1922 to 1936. In 1936, he co-founded the Left Book Club along with Victor Gollancz and John Strachey. He was a prolific writer and produced a number of books and essays throughout the 1920s and the 1930s.

At the LSE in the 1930s, Laski developed a connection with scholars from the Institute for Social Research, now more commonly known as the Frankfurt School. In 1933, with almost all the Institute's members in exile, Laski was among a number of British socialists, including Sidney Webb and RH Tawney, who arranged for the establishment of a London office for the Institute's use. After the Institute moved to Columbia University in 1934, Laski was one of its sponsored guest lecturers invited to New York. Laski also played a role in bringing Franz Neumann to join the Institute. After fleeing Germany almost immediately after Adolf Hitler's rise to power, Neumann did graduate work in political science under Laski and Karl Mannheim at the LSE and wrote his dissertation on the rise and fall of the rule of law. It was on Laski's recommendation that Neumann was then invited to join the Institute in 1936.

Teacher
Laski was a gifted lecturer, but he would alienate his audience by humiliating those who asked questions. However, he was liked by his students, and was especially influential among the Asian and African students who attended the LSE. Describing Laski's approach, Kingsley Martin wrote in 1968:

Ralph Miliband, another student of Laski, praised his teaching:

Ideology and political convictions
Laski's early work promoted pluralism, especially in the essays collected in Studies in the Problem of Sovereignty (1917), Authority in the Modern State (1919), and The Foundations of Sovereignty (1921). He argued that the state should not be considered supreme since people could and should have loyalties to local organisations, clubs, labour unions and societies. The state should respect those allegiances and promote pluralism and decentralisation.

Laski became a proponent of Marxism and believed in a planned economy based on the public ownership of the means of production. Instead of, as he saw it, a coercive state, Laski believed in the evolution of co-operative states that were internationally bound and stressed social welfare. He also believed that since the capitalist class would not acquiesce in its own liquidation, the co-operative commonwealth was not likely to be attained without violence. However, he also had a commitment to civil liberties, free speech and association and representative democracy. Initially, he believed that the League of Nations would bring about an "international democratic system". However, from the late 1920s, his political beliefs became radicalised, and he believed that it was necessary to go beyond capitalism to "transcend the existing system of sovereign states". Laski was dismayed by the Molotov–Ribbentrop Pact of August 1939 and wrote a preface to the Left Book Club collection criticising it, titled Betrayal of the Left.

Between the beginning of World War II in 1939 and the Attack on Pearl Harbor in 1941, which drew the United States into the war, Laski was a prominent voice advocating American support for the Allies, became a prolific author of articles in the American press, frequently undertook lecture tours in the US and influenced prominent American friends including Felix Frankfurter, Edward R. Murrow, Max Lerner, and Eric Sevareid. In his last years, he was disillusioned by the Cold War and the 1948 Czechoslovak coup d'état. George Orwell described him thus: "A socialist by allegiance, and a liberal by temperament".

Laski tried to mobilise Britain's academics, teachers and intellectuals behind the socialist cause, the Socialist League being one effort. He had some success but that element typically found itself marginalised in the Labour Party.

Zionism and anti-Catholicism
Laski was always a Zionist at heart and always felt himself a part of the Jewish nation, but he viewed traditional Jewish religion as restrictive. In 1946, Laski said in a radio address that the Catholic Church opposed democracy, and said that "it is impossible to make peace with the Roman Catholic Church. It is one of the permanent enemies of all that is decent in the human spirit".

Political career
Laski's main political role came as a writer and lecturer on every topic of concern to the left at that time, including socialism, capitalism, working conditions, eugenics, women's suffrage, imperialism, decolonisation, disarmament, human rights, worker education and Zionism. He was tireless in his speeches and pamphleteering and was always on call to help a Labour candidate. In between, he served on scores of committees and carried a full load as a professor and advisor to students.

Laski plunged into Labour Party politics on his return to London in 1920. In 1923, he turned down the offer of a Parliament seat and cabinet position by Ramsay MacDonald and also a seat in the Lords. He felt betrayed by MacDonald in the crisis of 1931 and decided that a peaceful, democratic transition to socialism would be blocked by the violence of the opposition. In 1932, Laski joined the Socialist League, a left-wing faction of the Labour Party. In 1937, he was involved in the failed attempt by the Socialist League in co-operation with the Independent Labour Party (ILP) and the Communist Party of Great Britain (CPGB) to form a Popular Front to bring down the Conservative government of Neville Chamberlain. In 1934 to 1945, he served as an alderman in the Fulham Borough Council and also the chairman of the libraries committee.

In 1937, the Socialist League was rejected by the Labour Party and folded. He was elected as a member of the Labour Party's National Executive Committee and he remained a member until 1949. In 1944, he chaired the Labour Party Conference and served as the party's chair in 1945 to 1946.

Declining role
During the war, he supported Prime Minister Winston Churchill's coalition government and gave countless speeches to encourage the battle against Nazi Germany. He suffered a nervous breakdown brought about by overwork. During the war, he repeatedly feuded with other Labour figures and with Churchill on matters great and small. He steadily lost his influence.

In 1942, he drafted the Labour Party pamphlet The Old World and the New Society calling for the transformation of Britain into a socialist state by allowing its government to retain wartime central economic planning and price controls into the postwar era. 

In the 1945 general election campaign, Churchill warned that Laski, as the Labour Party chairman, would be the power behind the throne in an Attlee government. While speaking for the Labour candidate in Nottinghamshire on 16 June 1945, Laski said, "If Labour did not obtain what it needed by general consent, we shall have to use violence even if it means revolution". The next day, accounts of Laski's speech appeared, and the Conservatives attacked the Labour Party for its chairman's advocacy of violence. Laski filed a libel suit against the Daily Express newspaper, which backed the Conservatives. The defence showed that over the years Laski had often bandied about loose threats of "revolution". The jury found for the newspaper  within forty minutes of deliberations.

Attlee gave Laski no role in the new Labour government. Even before the libel trial, Laski's relationship with Attlee had been strained. Laski had once called Attlee "uninteresting and uninspired" in the American press and even tried to remove him by asking for Attlee's resignation in an open letter. He tried to delay the Potsdam Conference until after Attlee's position was clarified. He tried to bypass Attlee by directly dealing with Churchill. Laski tried to pre-empt foreign policy decisions by laying down guidelines for the new Labour government. Attlee rebuked him:

Though he continued to work for the Labour Party until he died, he never regained political influence. His pessimism deepened as he disagreed with the anti-Soviet policies of the Attlee government in the emerging Cold War, and he was profoundly disillusioned with the anti-Soviet direction of American foreign policy.

Death

Laski contracted influenza and died in London on 24 March 1950, aged 56.

Legacy
Laski's biographer Michael Newman wrote:

Columbia professor Herbert A. Deane has identified five distinct phases of Laski's thought that he never integrated. The first three were pluralist (1914–1924), Fabian (1925–1931), and Marxian (1932–1939). There followed a 'popular-front' approach (1940–1945), and in the last years (1946–1950) near-incoherence and multiple contradictions. Laski's long-term impact on Britain is hard to quantify. Newman notes that "It has been widely held that his early books were the most profound and that he subsequently wrote far too much, with polemics displacing serious analysis."

However, Laski had a major long-term impact on support for socialism in India and other countries in Asia and Africa. He taught generations of future leaders at the LSE, including India's Jawaharlal Nehru. According to John Kenneth Galbraith, "the centre of Nehru's thinking was Laski" and "India the country most influenced by Laski's ideas". It is mainly due to his influence that the LSE has a semi-mythological status in India. He was steady in his unremitting advocacy of the independence of India. He was a revered figure to Indian students at the LSE. One Prime Minister of India said "in every meeting of the Indian Cabinet there is a chair reserved for the ghost of Professor Harold Laski". His recommendation of K. R. Narayanan (later President of India) to Nehru (then Prime Minister of India), resulted in Nehru appointing Narayanan to the Indian Foreign Service. In his memory, the Indian government established The Harold Laski Institute of Political Science in 1954 at Ahmedabad.

Speaking at a meeting organised in Laski's memory by the Indian League at London on 3 May 1950, Nehru praised him as follows:

Laski also educated the outspoken Chinese intellectual and journalist Chu Anping at LSE. Anping was later prosecuted by the Chinese Communist regime of the 1960s.

Laski was an inspiration for Ellsworth Toohey, the antagonist in Ayn Rand's novel The Fountainhead (1943). The posthumously published Journals of Ayn Rand, edited by David Harriman, include a detailed description of Rand attending a New York lecture by Laski, as part of gathering material for her novel, following which she changed the physical appearance of the fictional Toohey to fit that of the actual Laski.

Laski had a tortuous writing style. George Orwell, in his 1946 essay "Politics and the English Language" cited, as his first example of poor writing, a 53-word sentence with five negatives from Laski's "Essay in Freedom of Expression": "I am not, indeed, sure whether it is not true to say that the Milton who once seemed not unlike a seventeenth-century Shelley had not become, out of an experience ever more bitter in each year, more alien (sic) to the founder of that Jesuit sect which nothing could induce him to tolerate." (Orwell parodied it with " A not unblack dog was chasing a not unsmall rabbit across a not ungreen field.") However, 67 of the Labour MPs elected in 1945 had been taught by Laski as university students, at Workers' Educational Association classes or on courses for wartime officers. When Laski died, the Labour MP Ian Mikardo commented: "His mission in life was to translate the religion of the universal brotherhood of man into the language of political economy."

Partial bibliography
Basis of Vicarious Liability 1916 26 Yale Law Journal 105
Studies in the Problem of Sovereignty 1917
Authority in the Modern State 1919, 
Political Thought in England from Locke to Bentham 1920
The Foundations of Sovereignty, and other essays 1921
Karl Marx 1921
The state in the new social order 1922
The position of parties and the right of dissolution 1924
A Grammar of Politics, 1925
Socialism and freedom 1925
The problem of a second chamber 1925
Communism, 1927
The British Cabinet : a study of its personnel, 1801-1924 1928
Liberty in the Modern State, 1930
"The Dangers of Obedience and Other Essays" 1930
The limitations of the expert 1931
Democracy in Crisis 1933The State in Theory and Practice, 1935, The Viking PressThe Rise of European Liberalism: An Essay in Interpretation, 1936
 US title: The Rise of Liberalism: The Philosophy of a Business Civilization, 1936The American Presidency, 1940
 Where Do We Go From Here? A Proclamation of British Democracy 1940Reflections on the Revolution of our Time , 1943Faith, Reason, and Civilisation, 1944The American Democracy, 1948, The Viking PressCommunist Manifesto: Socialist Landmark: A New Appreciation Written for the Labour Party (1948)

See also
 American studies in the United Kingdom

References

Further reading
Deane, H. The Political Ideas of Harold Laski (1955)
 The Viscount Hailsham (Quintin Hogg), "The Political Ideas of Harold J. Laski by Herbert A. Deane: Review," Yale Law Journal, (1955) 65#2 pp 281–88 in JSTOR
 Ekirch, Arthur. "Harold Laski: the Liberal Manqué or Lost Libertarian?" Journal of Libertarian Studies (1980) 4#2 pp 139–50.
 Elliott W. Y. "The Pragmatic Politics of Mr. H. J. Laski," American Political Science Review (1924) 18#2 pp. 251–275 in JSTOR
 Greenleaf, W. H. "Laski and British Socialism," History of Political Thought (1981) 2#3 pp 573–591. 
 Hawkins, Carroll, "Harold J. Laski: A Preliminary Analysis," Political Science Quarterly (1950) 65#3 pp. 376–392 in JSTOR
 Hobsbawm, E.J., "The Left's Megaphone," London Review of Books  (1993) 12#13 pp 12–13. http://www.lrb.co.uk/v15/n13/eric-hobsbawm/the-lefts-megaphone
 Kampelman, Max M. "Harold J. Laski: A Current Analysis," Journal of Politics (1948) 10#1 pp. 131–154 in JSTOR
 Kramnick, Isaac, and Barry Sheerman. Harold Laski: A Life on the Left (1993) 669pp
 Lamb, Peter.  "Laski on Sovereignty: Removing the Mask from Class Dominance," History of Political Thought (1997) 28#2 pp 327–42.
 Lamb, Peter.  "Harold Laski (1893–1950): political theorist of a world in crisis," Review of International Studies (1999) 25#2 pp 329–342.
 Martin, Kingsley. Harold Laski (1893–1950) A Bibliographical Memoir  (1953)
 Miliband, Ralph. "Harold Laski's Socialism" (1995 [written 1958/59]) Socialist Register 1995, p. 239–65 (on marxists.org website)
 Morefield, Jeanne. "States Are Not People: Harold Laski on Unsettling Sovereignty, Rediscovering Democracy," Political Research Quarterly (2005) 58#4 pp. 659–669 in JSTOR
 Newman, Michael. Harold Laski: A Political Biography (1993), 438pp
 Newman, Michael. "Laski, Harold Joseph (1893–1950)", Oxford Dictionary of National Biography (Oxford University Press, 2004) online edn, Jan 2011 accessed 11 June 2013 doi:10.1093/ref:odnb/34412
 Peretz, Martin. "Laski Redivivus," Journal of Contemporary History (1966) 1#2  pp. 87–101 in JSTOR
 Schlesinger, Jr., Arthur. "Harold Laski: A Life on the Left," Washington Monthly'' (1 November 1993) online

External links
 
 
 
 
 Texts by Laski at McMaster University
 Biography and various quotations regarding Laski
 Brief biographical sketch from the London School of Economics
 
 

1893 births
1950 deaths
Academics of the London School of Economics
Alumni of New College, Oxford
British Zionists
Chairs of the Fabian Society
Chairs of the Labour Party (UK)
English economists
English male non-fiction writers
English non-fiction writers
English people of Belarusian-Jewish descent
English political philosophers
English socialists
English communists
English Marxists
Jewish anti-fascists
Jewish socialists
Labour Party (UK) officials
National Council for Civil Liberties people
The New Republic people
People educated at Manchester Grammar School
Politicians from Manchester
Writers from London
Writers from Manchester